In Greek mythology, Eurypylus  ( Eurypylos) was a king of the island of Cos.

Family 
Eurypylus was the son of Poseidon and Astypalaea or Mestra. He was the husband of Clytie and father of Chalciope, Chalcon and Antagoras.

Mythology 
Heracles landed on Cos to escape a storm sent upon him by Hera, but the Coans took him for a pirate and attacked him; in a battle that ensued, Eurypylus was killed by Heracles. In another version, Heracles planned the attack on Cos because he liked Eurypylus' daughter Chalciope and intended to abduct her. Chalciope is indeed known as the mother of Heracles's son Thessalus.

Calydonian family tree

Notes

References 

 Apollodorus, The Library with an English Translation by Sir James George Frazer, F.B.A., F.R.S. in 2 Volumes, Cambridge, MA, Harvard University Press; London, William Heinemann Ltd. 1921. ISBN 0-674-99135-4. Online version at the Perseus Digital Library. Greek text available from the same website.
 Hesiod, Catalogue of Women from Homeric Hymns, Epic Cycle, Homerica translated by Evelyn-White, H G. Loeb Classical Library Volume 57. London: William Heinemann, 1914. Online version at theio.com
 Theocritus, Idylls from The Greek Bucolic Poets translated by Edmonds, J M. Loeb Classical Library Volume 28. Cambridge, MA. Harvard Univserity Press. 1912. Online version at theoi.com
 Theocritus, Idylls edited by R. J. Cholmeley, M.A. London. George Bell & Sons. 1901. Greek text available at the Perseus Digital Library.
Kings in Greek mythology
Children of Poseidon
Demigods in classical mythology

Mythology of Heracles